A sister is a female sibling.

Sister may also refer to:

Role or title
Sister, the title of address for a nun
Sister, a title usually preceding a surname as a way to address a female parishioner in some Protestant church settings
Sister, a Jehovah's Witness term of address for a female co-religionist
Sister, a Mormon term of address for a female co-religionist
Sister, a Muslim term of address for a female co-religionist
Sister, a female member of a peer group
Sister, a term of address for a female member of the Rainbow Family of Living Light
Sister, a member of a sorority
Nursing sister, a senior female nurse
Religious sister (Catholic), a female member of certain Christian religious communities similar to but distinct from a nun

Arts and entertainment

Film
 Sister (2012 film), a Swiss drama film directed by Ursula Meier
 Sister (2014 film), an American drama film directed by David Lascher
 Sister (2018 film), an American stop-motion animated short film by Siqi Song
 Sister (2021 film), a Chinese film about family directed by Yin Ruoxi

Music
Sister (band), an American heavy metal band

Albums
Sister (Dover album), 1995
Sister (In Solitude album) or the title song, 2013
Sister (Letters to Cleo album) or the title song, 1998
Sister (Marbell album) or the title song, 2008
Sister (Sonic Youth album), 1987
Sister (Ultraísta album), 2020
The Sister (album), by Marissa Nadler, 2012

Songs
"Sister" (Porno Graffitti song), 2004
"Sister" (Sergio & The Ladies song), representing Belgium at Eurovision 2002
"Sister" (Sister2Sister song), 1999
"Sister" (S!sters song), representing Germany at Eurovision 2019
"Miss Celie's Blues" or "Sister", written by Quincy Jones, Rod Temperton and Lionel Richie for the film The Color Purple, 1985
"Sister", by the Black Keys from El Camino, 2011
"Sister", by Bros from The Time, 1989
"Sister", by Caribou from Suddenly, 2020
"Sister", by the Ex from Turn, 2004
"Sister", by Icehouse from Icehouse, 1980
"Sister", by K.Flay from Solutions, 2019
"Sister", by Lenny Kravitz from Are You Gonna Go My Way, 1993
"Sister", by Mike McGear from Woman, 1972
"Sister", by Mumford & Sons, 2008
"Sister", by the Nixons from Foma, 1995
"Sister", by Prince from Dirty Mind, 1980
"Sister", by She Wants Revenge from She Wants Revenge, 2006
"Sister", /"Nation", by Brockhampton from Saturation III, 2017

Other media
"Sister" (New Girl), a television episode
The Sister (play)
The Sister (TV series)
Sister, a 1952 book by Stan and Jan Berenstain
Sister Bear, a character, introduced in 1974, from the Berenstain Bears media franchise
Sister station, or sister channel, in broadcasting, one of a pair of radio or television stations operated by the same company

Other uses
Sister group, in phylogenetics
Sister ship
Amanda Sister (born 1990), South African footballer
, a United States Navy tug in commission from 1917 to 1919

See also
Sisters (disambiguation)
Sister city
Little Sister (disambiguation)
Big Sister (disambiguation)

 Adelpha or sisters, a butterfly genus
 Kakak (Sister), a 2015 Indonesian film